An Hour Before It's Dark is the 20th studio album by British neo-progressive rock band Marillion, released on 4 March 2022 by Intact and earMUSIC.

Background
On 3 August 2021, Marillion announced the launch of their new pre-order campaign for the recording and release of a new studio album, their first since With Friends from the Orchestra (2019). Frontman Steve Hogarth said "the overall feeling" of the album "is surprisingly upbeat", with the Choir Noir adding "new soul" and "colour" to the music.

The album includes a behind the scenes documentary about the making of the record, and a performance of "Murder Machines" from Real World Studios.

Release
An Hour Before It's Dark was released on 4 March 2022. To promote the record, several London black cabs were decorated with the album's artwork and free rides are given if the customer mentioned a password, which was the album's title. The promotion ran from 4–14 March.

On 7 March 2022, the band announced a 9-date UK tour for September 2022.

Commercial performance
On the UK Albums Chart dated 11 March 2022, An Hour Before It's Dark entered at number two, their highest chart position since Clutching at Straws in 1987.

Track listing

Note: After 4 minutes of silence following "Angels on Earth", the CD will play a 12" remix of "Murder Machines".

Personnel
Marillion
Pete Trewavas – bass guitar
Ian Mosley – drums
Steve Rothery – electric guitar
Mark Kelly – keyboards
Steve Hogarth – lead vocals

Additional musicians
Choir Noir – vocals on "Murder Machines", "The Crow and the Nightingale", "Care"

Production
Marillion – production
Michael Hunter – production, recording, mixing
Simon Ward – artwork

Charts

References

2022 albums
Marillion albums
Albums impacted by the COVID-19 pandemic